The Valenzuela City School of Mathematics and Science (VCSMS), also referred to as ValMaSci, is a specialized public high school in Valenzuela City, Philippines. 

Established in 2003 as the Valenzuela City Science High School, it offers a special advanced curriculum with emphasis in the fields of mathematics and science to residents of the city. The school also has a specialized range of subjects in technology, engineering, and language.

History

Foundation
The Valenzuela City School of Mathematics and Science traces its roots to the Science Oriented Experimental Class (SOEC), an education program organized by former Valenzuela City mayor Jose Emmanuel Carlos. SOEC was initiated in school year 1996–97 "to shape and produce globally competitive and morally upright individuals who will serve as foundation of [the] nation's great success." The class, which was composed of 40 academically outstanding students, was housed at the city's national high school, the Valenzuela National High School (VNHS), in Barangay Marulas. 

On May 14, 2003, seven years after SOEC was created, an ordinance establishing a science high school from the original SOEC was approved. The school, under the name Valenzuela City Science High School, was to be funded by the local School Board of Valenzuela.

Valenzuela City Science High School
On February 8, 2003, a memorandum was sent to all principals of public and private elementary schools of the city, requesting them to inform their graduating students to apply for the qualifying examination for the upcoming admission of first year high school students in VCSHS. With 200 applicants administered, 108 students passed the admission tests (consisting of an intelligence quotient test, proficiency test, and interview). They enrolled at the new school with Brian E. Ilan as the first principal. On June 9, 2003, the first VCSHS Parents, Teachers, and Community Association (PTCA) was formed.

From the original six teachers, the institution added eight teachers. Additional students made the VCSHS community larger as the years passed. At the beginning of the school year 2005–06, VCSHS moved to its newly constructed building at A. Marcelo Street in Barangay Dalandanan. City mayor Sherwin Gatchalian inaugurated the new house and 4th year students entered VCSHS. During the year, Ilan was replaced by Lagrimas B. Bayle as the new school principal. Through her time, a recorded shortest graduation (as observed by teachers) happened for the 15 students of SOEC passing the 4th year curriculum of ValSci.

By the school year 2006–07, Genindina M. Sumbillo entered ValSci from Valenzuela National High School–Mapulang Lupa Annex to replace Lagrimas B. Bayle. Before the end of school year 2007–08, Arneil D. Aro replaced Sumbillo who had been promoted as principal of Caruhatan National High School. And at the midst of 2011–12, Edelina I. Golloso took the principal seat replacing Aro. Ilan resumed his duties as principal, relieving Golloso of her overseeing duties starting the last quarter of the SY 2011–12. The following year, in September, Ilan was again relieved from the position, with Jameson H. Tan replacing him.

New school campus
In early 2014, Valenzuela City Mayor Rexlon Gatchalian announced the construction of a new state-of-the-art campus under the name Valenzuela City School of Mathematics and Science. This is a part of the Education 360° Investment Program of the local government that included feeder programs, the provision of school supplies, and training for students, parents, and teachers. Gatchalian explained, "This is a large-scale investment to shore up the local education system." Out of the ₱300 million budget allotted to the plan, ₱199 million was spent on the construction and outfit of the new school campus. He said that the soon-to-rise school is the "best education investment [the] city has ever made."

The groundbreaking of the new school site in Barangay Malinta was held on January 27, 2014. Gatchalian, local government officials, the Valenzuela City Science High School faculty and students, and the Department of Education (DepEd) secretary Armin Luistro attended the ceremony. The mayor said in his speech, "If you look at their NAT scores, their scores are one of the highest in Metro Manila. If you look at their UPCAT results, they have a very high passing rate every year. That's why we have to show the brightest and the most intelligent students of Valenzuela City that they will be entering the most modernized high school here in Valenzuela and we'll make sure that this will be the most pleasant science high school building in the Philippines." He said in another interview that "these classrooms will be available for use when classes open in June this year."

The changing of the school name to Valenzuela City School of Mathematics and Science gained much dispute around the school community. Gatchalian responded saying "The reason is because we do better in math compared to science." DepEd secretary Luistro said, "I'm okay with the name change but I'm more concerned with the substantial changes in the curriculum, the quantity of its graduates and how many of them will take math or science related courses in college." The new name was proposed by city councilor Lorena Natividad-Borja. It was signed by the mayor as City Ordinance No. 120, which includes the enhancement of mathematics program in the new curriculum.

The campus was completed in August 2014, six months after the groundbreaking ceremony, and was inaugurated on September 1, 2014. Luistro praised the city's education program saying, "I am very much impressed by this city's investment in education. Aside from this new city school, Valenzuela City has found solutions for the decongestion of schools within their area through the 'busing system,' by transferring students from one school to another." Gatchalian, during the tour of the newly constructed building, said, "With something as grand as this, we want to stir an interest in mathematics and science among the youth in Valenzuela City." 

The four-storey school building is a full Wi-Fi zone and contains 20 classrooms, which can hold 35 to 40 students each, and physics and robotics, speech, computer, chemistry, biology, and mathematics laboratories. Each of the six laboratories is equipped with an interactive Smart Board, while the science (physics and robotics, chemistry, and biology) laboratories have two areas: one for lecture and another for experiments.

Dubbed as the "crown jewel" of the city when it comes to education investments, the Valenzuela City School of Mathematics and Science is said to be envisioned as part of the most high-tech and advanced mathematics and science schools in the Philippines. To keep the building, its facilities, and other tangible concerns proper, the city government assigned personnel to function as building administrators. Classes at the new campus began on September 8, 2014. Luistro said, "My prayer is that Valenzuela City School of Mathematics and Science may produce the best and brightest scientists of the country."

During the school year 2015–2016, the principal Jameson Tan was replaced with Ma. Christina Cedeño Salonga, the former being assigned to Lawang Bato National High School. On July 3, 2018, the principal was replaced by Jaime S. De Vera Jr., and on February 28, 2023, the principal position was transferred to Juliana Tamayo Alvarez, with the former being assigned to Wawang Pulo National High School.

Admission
To be admitted to the Valenzuela City School of Mathematics and Science, the applicant must be a bona fide resident of Valenzuela City; must not have a grade in any subject during his elementary school lower than 85; and must pass the admission exam. Applicants who have obtained at least 85% of the admission test are considered for admission. No students will be allowed to enroll in the next school year unless an average of at least 85% is maintained in all subject areas. According to City Ordinance No. 120, the top two students of each graduating elementary batch of Valenzuela City public schools are exempted from taking the exam and will be automatically admitted to the school, if they choose to accept the offer.

References

External links

Websites
 (outdated)
 (under construction)

2003 establishments in the Philippines
2014 establishments in the Philippines
Educational institutions established in 2003
Educational institutions established in 2014
Schools in Valenzuela, Metro Manila
Science high schools in Metro Manila
Public schools in Metro Manila